Kaarle Tapper (born 19 September 1995) is a Finnish competitive sailor. He competed at the 2016 Summer Olympics in Rio de Janeiro, in the men's Laser class.

He has qualified to represent Finland at the 2020 Summer Olympics.

References

External links

1995 births
Living people
Finnish male sailors (sport)
Olympic sailors of Finland
Sailors at the 2010 Summer Youth Olympics
Sailors at the 2016 Summer Olympics – Laser
Sailors at the 2020 Summer Olympics – Laser